Carlos Manuel Pazo Torrado (born 6 June 1963) is a Cuban politician. He was the Cuban Minister of Transportation from 20 June 2003 till 20 October 2006. He started his career in 1984 as in a cadastral office. In 1993 he was promoted to the Member of the Provincial Bureau of the CPC in Las Tunas. He is an expert in geodesics and cartography. Before the nomination he was the head of the Department of Construction, Transport and Communications of the Central Committee of CPC.

External links 
 cuban-store.com
 www.thefreelibrary.com
 findarticles.com

Living people
1963 births
Transport ministers of Cuba
Communist Party of Cuba politicians
Government ministers of Cuba